Beinn Teallach (914.6 m), is a mountain in the Grampian Mountains of Scotland, located east of the village of Roybridge in Lochaber.

A mostly rounded peak, it has a steep eastern face. Beinn Teallach was previously thought to be a Corbett but was later found to reach Munro status by 20 cm, making it the smallest Munro in Scotland. Climbs usually start from Glen Spean.

References

Mountains and hills of Highland (council area)
Marilyns of Scotland
Munros